Guanine nucleotide-binding protein G(t) subunit alpha-2 is a protein that in humans is encoded by the GNAT2 gene.

Function 

Transducin is a 3-subunit guanine nucleotide-binding protein (G protein) which stimulates the coupling of rhodopsin and cGMP-phosphodiesterase during visual impulses. The transducin alpha subunits in rods and cones are encoded by separate genes. This gene encodes the alpha subunit in cones.

References

Further reading

External links
  GeneReviews/NIH/NCBI/UW entry on Achromatopsia
  OMIM entries on Achromatopsia